The following is an overview of the events of 1958 in motorsport including the major racing events, motorsport venues that were opened and closed during a year, championships and non-championship events that were established and disestablished in a year, and births and deaths of racing drivers and other motorsport people.

Annual events
The calendar includes only annual major non-championship events or annual events that had own significance separate from the championship. For the dates of the championship events see related season articles.

Births

Deaths

See also
List of 1958 motorsport champions

References

External links

 
Motorsport by year